Moses Noovao-McGreal (born 7 December 1996) is a Cook Islands international rugby league footballer who plays as a  or  for the Norths Devils in the Queensland Cup.

Background
Noovao-McGreal was born in Auckland, New Zealand. He is of Cook Islands descent.

He played his junior rugby league for the Noosa Pirates.

Playing career

Club career
Noovao-McGreal played in the NSW Cup for the Manly-Warringah Sea Eagles between 2015 and 2016.

He joined the Norths Devils ahead of the 2018 Queensland Cup season.

International career
In 2016 Noovao-McGreal made his international début for the Cook Islands against Lebanon.

He played for the Cook Islands at the 2019 Rugby League World Cup 9s. He made three appearances without scoring a try at the competition.

In 2022 Noovao-McGreal was named in the Cook Islands squad for the 2021 Rugby League World Cup.

References

External links
Norths Devils profile
Queensland Cup profile
Cook Islands profile

1996 births
Living people
Cook Islands national rugby league team players
New Zealand rugby league players
New Zealand sportspeople of Cook Island descent
Rugby league locks